Bradford Field may refer to:

Bradford Field (New Jersey), a private airport in Flemington, New Jersey, United States (FAA: NJ49)
Bradford Field (North Carolina), a private airport in Huntersville, North Carolina, United States (FAA: NC05)

See also
Bradford Airport (disambiguation)